Unione Sportiva Inveruno is an Italian football club based in Inveruno, Lombardy. Currently it plays in Italy's Serie D.

History

Foundation
The club was founded in 1945.

Serie D
In the season 2012–13 the team was promoted after 50 years, from Eccellenza Lombardy/A to Serie D.

Colors and badge
The team's colors are yellow and blue.

Honours
Eccellenza:
Winner (1): 2012–13

References

External links
Official website 

Football clubs in Italy
Association football clubs established in 1945
Football clubs in Lombardy
1945 establishments in Italy